The Toronto Public Library operates a total of 100 branch libraries across Toronto, Ontario, Canada.

References

External links
A-Z list of branches at the Toronto Public Library

Municipal buildings in Toronto

Carnegie libraries in Canada